Plácido Álvarez-Buylla Lozana (5 April 1885 - 10 August 1938) was a Spanish footballer, diplomat and politician, who was the Minister of Industry and Commerce in 1936. He had three brothers, Benito, Plácido and Adolfo, and the latter two also were footballers. As a young man Plácido played football in Asturias, Madrid and Barcelona, at the clubs Oviedo FC, Madrid FC, Español de Madrid and Espanyol, reaching Copa del Rey finals with the latter three.

Football career
Born in Asturias to a Spanish sociologist, pedagogue, jurist and professor of Krausism influence (Adolfo Álvarez-Buylla senior), he enjoyed his youth playing football in his hometown club Oviedo FC, featuring alongside the illustrious professor of history, Rafael Altamira, then a professor at the University of Oviedo. Plácido began to play football aged 15 in 1900, when this sport was still relatively unknown in Spain, being induced to do so by a friend who had returned from England where he had spent a season, and from where he returned as one of the most enthusiastic fans of the sport.

In 1906, he moved to the capital to continue his Law studies and there he signed for Real Madrid CF (then known as Madrid FC). Despite having the likes of José Berraondo, José Quirante and Joaquín Yarza in its back-line, Plácido's physical attributes and well-built constitution earned him a position among those who were part of the first team as either a midfielder or a defender, but mostly as the latter. However, despite some encouraging first steps in the white club, a split in the club led by the Giralt brothers (Armando and José), led Plácido to leave Madrid and join the city rivals Español de Madrid, with whom he reached back-to-back Copa del Rey finals (1909 and 1910) which ended in losses to Club Ciclista and FC Barcelona, losing the latter despite a brace from his younger brother Vicente Buylla.

In 1910, the two Giralt brothers, Antonio Neyra and his brother Vicente left Español to join RCD Espanyol in Barcelona, and they once again proved their quality by reaching yet another cup final in 1911, in which he started in a 3–1 loss to Athletic Bilbao.

His time as a footballer naturally served his political life since being part of a team acquires a habit of discipline that is absolutely necessary for politics.

Diplomatic career
In 1914 he graduated in law at the University of Oviedo, and obtained his doctorate at the University of Madrid. In 1916 he joined the diplomatic corps and served as a representative to several nations. In 1924 he was awarded the Order of St. Gregory the Great by the Vatican. In 1933 he was appointed director general of the Spanish protectorate in Morocco.

When the Popular Front won the February 1936 elections, he was appointed the Minister of Industry and Commerce, a position he held until 4 September of the same year when the first government of Francisco Largo Caballero was formed. After that he was appointed consul general of the Republic in Gibraltar, a position he held until 20 February 1938 when he was sent to Paris, where he died on August.

Honours

Club
Madrid FC
Centro Championship:
Champions (1): 1906–07
Copa del Rey:
Champions (1): 1907

Español de Madrid
Copa del Rey:
Runner-up (2): 1909 and 1910

RCD Espanyol
Copa del Rey:
Runner-up (1): 1911

See also 
 List of Real Madrid CF players

References

1885 births
Spanish footballers
Association football forwards
Footballers from Oviedo
Real Madrid CF players
RCD Espanyol footballers
1938 deaths